A statue of the civil rights activist and politician Marian Spencer was installed in Cincinnati's Smale Park, in the U.S. state of Ohio, in 2021.

References

2021 establishments in Ohio
2021 sculptures
Buildings and structures in Cincinnati
Monuments and memorials in Ohio
Outdoor sculptures in Ohio
Sculptures of African Americans
Sculptures of women in Ohio
Statues in Ohio